The Kirtland Formation (originally the Kirtland Shale) is a sedimentary geological formation.

Description 
The Kirtland Formation is the product of alluvial muds and overbank sand deposits from the many channels draining the coastal plain that existed on the inland seashore of North America, in the late Cretaceous period. It overlies the Fruitland Formation. It is found in the San Juan Basin in the states of New Mexico and Colorado, in the United States of America.

The base of the Kirtland Formation and its lowest sub-unit, the Hunter Wash member, has been dated to 75.02 ± 0.13 Ma. Together with the upper part of the underlying Fruitland Formation, this contains fossils representing the Hunter Wash local fauna. The border between the Hunter Wash member and overlying Farmington member dates to approximately 74 million years ago. The top of the Farmington member and bottom of the overlying De-na-zin member has been radiometrically dated to 73.83 ± 0.18 Ma ago. The top of the De-na-zin member, which contains the Willow Wash local fauna, has been dated to 73.49 ± 0.25 Ma ago.

Overlying the De-na-zin member is a unit called the Naashoibito member This has often been considered to be part of the Kirtland formation, but more recently has been transferred back to the overlying Ojo Alamo Formation, which it had originally been part of.

History of investigation 
The formation was named by C.M. Bauer in 1916 for exposures near the Kirtland Post Office.

Stratigraphy

Vertebrate paleofauna

Saurischians

Ornithischians

Pterosaurs

Crurotarsans

Turtles

Bony fish

Cartilaginous fish

See also 
 List of stratigraphic units with dinosaur body fossils

References

Bibliography 
 
 
 
 
 
 
 
 
 
 
 
 
 
 
 

Cretaceous formations of New Mexico
 01
Upper Cretaceous Series of North America
Campanian Stage
Sandstone formations of the United States
Shale formations of the United States
Mudstone formations
Conglomerate formations
Deltaic deposits
Fluvial deposits